Dayán Enrique Díaz (born February 10, 1989) is a Colombian former professional baseball pitcher. He previously played for the Cincinnati Reds and Houston Astros.

Career

Cincinnati Reds
Díaz was called up to the majors for the first time on May 22, 2016.

Houston Astros
Díaz signed a minor league contract with the Houston Astros on January 21, 2017. On May 5, 2017, he was promoted to the major leagues to replace Michael Feliz who went on Family Medical Emergency leave. He was designated for assignment on August 31, 2017.

Los Angeles Angels
On September 4, 2017, Díaz was claimed off waivers by the Los Angeles Angels. On March 29, 2018, the Angels placed Díaz on the restricted list after he failed to report for spring training due to visa issues. He elected free agency on October 11, 2018.

References

External links

1989 births
Living people
Arizona League Cubs players
Cangrejeros de Santurce (baseball) players
Colombian expatriate baseball players in Puerto Rico
Cardenales de Lara players
Cincinnati Reds players
Colombian expatriate baseball players in the United States
Daytona Cubs players
Fresno Grizzlies players
Gulf Coast Astros players
Houston Astros players
Leones del Escogido players
Colombian expatriate baseball players in the Dominican Republic
Lexington Legends players
Liga de Béisbol Profesional Roberto Clemente pitchers
Louisville Bats players
Major League Baseball pitchers
Major League Baseball players from Colombia
Pawtucket Red Sox players
Sportspeople from Cartagena, Colombia
Portland Sea Dogs players
Venezuelan Summer League Astros players
Salem Red Sox players
Tennessee Smokies players
Tri-City ValleyCats players
2017 World Baseball Classic players